Aust-Agder County Municipality was the regional governing administration of the old Aust-Agder county in Norway. The county municipality was established on 1 January 1976 when the law was changed to allow elected county councils in Norway. The county municipality was dissolved on 1 January 2020, when Aust-Agder was merged with the neighboring Vest-Agder county, creating the new Agder county which is led by the Agder County Municipality. 

The main responsibilities of the county municipality included the running of eight upper secondary schools with about 4,500 pupils. It was also in charge of county-wide regional planning, county roads, public transport, dental care, culture, and cultural heritage. The administrative centre of the county is the town of Arendal.  

Stein Ytterdahl was the last County Governor of Aust-Agder (from 2016 until its dissolution in 2020, there was one county governor for both Aust-Agder and Vest-Agder counties). The Governor was the representative of the King and Government of Norway in the county, functioning as the connection between the state and the municipalities.

County government
The Aust-Agder county council is made up of 35 representatives that were elected every four years. The council essentially acted as a Parliament or legislative body for the county and it met several times each year. The council is divided into standing committees and an executive board which meet considerably more often. Both the council and executive board are led by the County Mayor who held the executive powers of the county. From 2017 until its dissolution in 2020, Gro Bråten of the Labour Party was the County Mayor and the Deputy County Mayor was Jon-Olav Strand of the Christian Democratic Party.

County council
The party breakdown of the council is as follows:

References

 
Aust-Agder
County municipalities of Norway
1976 establishments in Norway
2020 disestablishments in Norway